Michael Ridpath is an English author of thrillers involving the world of high finance. He was born in Devon in 1961 and grew up in Yorkshire. He was educated at Millfield School and Merton College, Oxford, and spent eight years working as a bond trader at an international bank in the City of London. His past employers include Saudi International Bank and Apax Partners.

Ridpath lives in north London with three children and his wife, Barbara Ridpath. His latest work is the Fire & Ice series about an Icelandic detective called Magnus Jonson.

Bibliography

Financial thrillers
 Free to Trade (1995)
 Trading Reality (1996)
 The Marketmaker (1998)
 Final Venture (2000)
 The Predator (2001)
 Fatal Error (2003)

Alex Calder
 On The Edge (2005)
 See No Evil (2006)

Magnus Iceland Mysteries
 Where The Shadows Lie (Corvus, June 2010)
 66° North (Corvus, May 2011)
 Edge of Nowhere (Corvus, December 2011)
 Meltwater (June 2012)
 Sea of Stone (May 2014)
 The Wanderer (September 2018)

Conrad de Lancey - pre-WWII & WWII spy novels
 Traitor's Gate (Head of Zeus, June 2013)
 Shadows of War (Head of Zeus, January 2015)

Stand-alone novels
 Amnesia (Corvus, May 2017)
 Launch Code (Corvus, 2019)

Short Stories 

 "Partnership Track" (2005), published in The Detection Collection, edited by Simon Brett.

References

External links 
Michael Ridpath's website

1961 births
Living people
English writers
People educated at Millfield
Alumni of Merton College, Oxford